The 1996-97 season was the 108th season of competitive football by Celtic.

Pre-season and friendlies

Season Summary 
Once again, the season saw a very close title race between the two Old Firm teams. Celtic consistently remained second, only topping the table for a few days at the start of November, but stayed hot on the heels of Rangers, usually only being a couple of points behind them, and sometimes only by goal difference. However, a poor run of form in March saw Rangers pull decisively ahead in the title race, especially after a 1–0 victory at Celtic Park, and this led to the dismissal of manager Tommy Burns three games before the end of the season.

Competitions

Scottish Premier Division

League table

Results by round

Matches

Scottish League Cup

Scottish Cup

UEFA Cup

Statistics

Disciplinary record
Includes all competitive matches. Players listed below made at least one appearance for Celtic first squad during the season.

Transfers

Transfers in

Total spending:  £7.95 million

Players out

Total income:  £3.72 million

See also
 List of Celtic F.C. seasons

Celtic F.C. seasons
Celtic